Psalm 119 is the 119th psalm of the Book of Psalms, beginning in the English of the King James Version: "Blessed are the undefiled in the way, who walk in the law of the Lord". The Book of Psalms is in the third section of the Hebrew Bible, the Khetuvim, and a book of the Christian Old Testament. The psalm, which is anonymous, is referred to in Hebrew by its opening words, "Ashrei temimei derech" ("happy are those whose way is perfect"). In Latin, it is known as "Beati inmaculati in via qui ambulant in lege Domini".

The psalm is a hymn psalm and an acrostic poem, in which each set of eight verses begins with a letter of the Hebrew alphabet. The theme of the verses is the prayer of one who delights in and lives by the Torah, the sacred law. Psalms 1, 19 and this psalm may be referred to as "the psalms of the Law".

In the slightly different numbering system used in the Greek Septuagint and Latin Vulgate translations of the Bible, this psalm is Psalm 119. With 176 verses, the psalm is the longest psalm as well as the longest chapter in the Bible.

The psalm forms a regular part of Jewish, Orthodox, Catholic, Lutheran, Anglican and other Protestant liturgies. It has often been set to music. British politician William Wilberforce would recite the entire Psalm while walking back from Parliament, through Hyde Park, to his home.

Background and themes
In Judaism, Psalm 119 has the monikers Alpha-Beta and Temanya Apin (Aramaic: "eight faces").

Text
Versions which mark the original section divisions include the American Standard Version, the New International Version and the New King James Version. The Good News Translation has a sub-heading for each stanza, although biblical commentator C. S. Rodd considers this practice "misleading" because it suggests that "each stanza expresses a special theme".

Structure

Psalm 119 is one of several acrostic poems found in the Bible. Its 176 verses are divided into 22 stanzas, one for each of the 22 characters that make up the Hebrew alphabet. In the Hebrew text, each of the eight verses of each stanza begins with the same Hebrew letter. This feature was not maintained in the Septuagint, except that many manuscripts have placed at the beginning of each stanza the name of the corresponding Hebrew letter (for example, ʾalef the first stanza, the last is taw).

Because of this structure, the Psalm was one of the main occurrences of the Hebrew alphabet in the texts of the medieval and modern West.

Each of the 22 sections of 8 verses is subheaded with the name of a letter in the Hebrew alphabet. These subheadings are spelled very differently amongst the various Bible text versions, even amongst the translations into different foreign languages. Their antiquated spellings shown in the Authorized King James Version of 1611 were written with influences of Latin and German medieval theological scholarship—forms which greatly differ from the standard modern-day renditions.

Most printed editions also show the actual Hebrew letters along with these subheadings.

Literary features
This psalm is one of about a dozen alphabetic acrostic poems in the Bible. Its 176 verses are divided into twenty-two stanzas, one stanza for each letter of the Hebrew alphabet; within each stanza, each of the eight verses begins (in Hebrew) with that letter. The name of God (Yahweh/Jehovah) appears twenty-four times.

Employed in almost every verse of the psalm is a synonym for the Torah, such as dabar ("word, promise"), mishpatim ("rulings"), etc. Rodd identifies 8 such words, generally translated as 'law', 'promise', 'word', 'statutes', 'commandments', 'ordinances', 'decrees', and 'precepts' in the New Revised Standard Version. However, he considers "unlikely" the possibility explored by some scholars that all eight words were originally to be found in every stanza.

The acrostic form and the use of the Torah words constitute the framework for an elaborate prayer. The grounds for the prayer are established in the first two stanzas (alef and beth): the Torah is held up as a source of blessing and right conduct, and the psalmist pledges to dedicate himself to the law. The prayer proper begins in the third stanza (gimel, v. 17). Like many other psalms, this prayer includes dramatic lament (e.g. verses 81–88), joyous praise (e.g. verses 45–48) and prayers for life, deliverance and vindication (e.g. verses 132–34). What makes Psalm 119 unique is the way that these requests are continually and explicitly grounded in the gift of the Torah and the psalmist's loyalty to it.

The first and fifth verses in a stanza often state the same theme followed by a statement of opposition, affliction or conflict, and the final (eighth) verse tends to be a transition introducing the next stanza. Several dozen prayers are incorporated into the Psalm, e.g. "Open my eyes that I may behold wondrous things out of your law." Themes include opposition by man, affliction, delight in the law and the goodness of God, which sometimes run into each other: "I know, O Lord, that your rules are righteous, and that in faithfulness you have afflicted me" (v. 75), or "If your law had not been my delight, I would have perished in my affliction" (v. 92). It ends with an appeal to God to seek his servant who strayed.

Uses

Judaism
 Verse 66 is recited prior to the shofar blowing on Rosh Hashanah.
 Verse 72 is quoted in Pirkei Avot, Chapter 6, no. 9.
 Verses 89–91 are recited during the blessings before the Shema on the second day of Rosh Hashanah.
 Verse 99 is quoted in Pirkei Avot, Chapter 4, no. 1.
 Verse 108 is recited prior to the shofar blowing on Rosh Hashanah.
 Verse 122 is recited prior to the shofar blowing on Rosh Hashanah.
 Verse 142 is part of Uva Letzion and Tzidkatcha.
 Parts of verses 153–54 comprise the blessing Re'eh of the weekday Amidah.
 Verse 160 is recited prior to the shofar blowing on Rosh Hashanah.
 Verse 162 is recited prior to the shofar blowing on Rosh Hashanah.
 Verse 165 is part of Talmud Berachos 64a.
 Verses 166, 162, and 165 are recited in that order by the mohel at a brit milah.

Eastern Orthodox

The psalm (118 in the Septuagint) figures prominently in the worship of the Eastern Orthodox Church. There is a tradition that King David used this psalm to teach his young son Solomon the alphabet—but not just the alphabet for writing letters: the alphabet of the spiritual life.

The psalm comprises an entire Kathisma (division of the Psalter) in Orthodox liturgical practice. In Orthodox monasteries it is read daily at the Midnight Office: "At midnight I arose to give thanks unto Thee for the judgments of Thy righteousness" (v. 62). It is read at Matins on Saturdays and is also chanted on many Sundays throughout the year. A major portion of Matins on Holy Saturday comprises chanting the entire psalm as a threnody, divided into three parts (stases) with Praises (Greek: Enkomia) interspersed between each verse. This chanting is done as all stand holding candles around a catafalque over which has been placed the Epitaphion (a shroud embroidered with the figure of Christ laid out for burial).

The psalm is also chanted with special solemnity at Orthodox funeral services and on the various All-Souls Days occurring throughout the year, with "Alleluia" chanted between each verse. Its use here is a reflection of the chanting done on Holy Saturday. "Alleluia" is chanted between the verses to signify the victory over death accomplished by Christ's death and Resurrection, and the eternal reward promised to the faithful.

The Psalm contains several dozen prayers and several themes run through it. God's goodness in the midst of affliction and delight in God's law. God is seen sovereignly "inclining ones heart" and the Psalmist "inclines his heart" to the statutes.

Latin Church liturgy 

The Rule of Saint Benedict assigned this psalm to four minor canonical hours on Sundays and three on Mondays. The sections corresponding to the first four letters of the 22-letter Hebrew alphabet are used at Prime, the following sets of three sections at Terce, Sext and None on Sundays. The remaining sections corresponding to the last nine letters of the Hebrew alphabet, are assigned to Terce, Sext and None on Mondays.

The 1568 Roman Breviary of Pope Pius V has Psalm 119 recited in its entirety every day: the sections corresponding to the first four letters of the Hebrew alphabet at Prime, and the others in sets of six sections each at Terce, Sext and None respectively.

In the 1910 reform of the Roman Breviary by Pope Pius X, Psalm 119 is recited only on Sundays, divided as in the arrangement of Pius V.

Since the reform of the Roman Rite liturgy in the wake of the Second Vatican Council, the Liturgy of the Hours has a section of Psalm 119, corresponding to a single letter of the Hebrew alphabet, in the midday canonical hour on each day of the four-week cycle except on Monday of the first week (when the second half of Psalm 19 (18), which is similar in theme, is used instead) and on Friday of the third week (when the Passion Psalm 22 (21) is used). In addition, a section of Psalm 119 is used at Saturday Lauds in weeks 1 and 3, and another section at Vespers of Saturday of week 1.

In the Roman Rite Mass, portions of Psalm 119 are used a responsorial psalm on Sundays 6 and 17 of Year A of the three-year cycle of Sunday readings, on Saturday of the first week in Lent and on the third Monday in Eastertide. It is also used on five days of Year I of the two-year cycle of Ordinary Time weekday readings and fifteen days of Year II. A portion is also used on the feast of a Doctor of the Church.

Book of Common Prayer
In the Church of England's Book of Common Prayer, this psalm is appointed to be read in sections between the 24th and 26th days of the month.

Musical settings

 Psalm 119:1 was set to music by Charles Villiers Stanford in Three Latin Motets, Op. 38.
 Psalm 119:18 inspired the hymn Open My Eyes, That I May See by Clara H. Scott.
 Psalm 119:33–38 was set to music by William Byrd as Teach Me, O Lord.
 Psalm 119:57–64 was set to music by Robert White (composer) as Portio mea Domine.
 Psalm 119:89 is a popular Nigerian praise song.
 Psalm 119:105 was set to music by Amy Grant as "Thy Word" on the 1984 album Straight Ahead.
 Psalm 119:105–111 was set to music by Henry Purcell as "Thy word is a lantern".
 Psalm 119:1–176 was completed in 1671 by Heinrich Schütz.
 Psalm 119:18, 36, and 133 as "Open Thou Mine Eyes" by John Rutter. Performed by The Cambridge Singers on "Gloria" and other albums.
 Czech composer Antonín Dvořák set verses 114, 117, 119 and 120 to music in his Biblical Songs (1894).

A complete English version of Psalm 119 from the King James Bible was completed by Frederick Steinruck, Michael Misiaszek, and Michael Owens.

In Protestant Christianity, various metrical settings of Psalm 119 have been published, including "O God, My Strength and Fortitude" by Thomas Sternhold, which appeared in the Scottish Psalter of 1564. The Psalm is put to music in The Book of Psalms for Worship, published by Crown and Covenant Publications.

See also
 Lamentations 3, also an acrostic, with three verses per stanza 
 It is time to work for the Lord

Notes

References

Further reading 
 
 Scott N. Callaham: "An Evaluation of Psalm 119 as Constrained Writing", Hebrew Studies 50 (2009): 121–135.

External links 

 
 Psalms Chapter 119 text in Hebrew and English, Mechon-mamre.
 Psalm 119:1 introduction and text, Bible study tools.
 Psalm 119 – The Greatness and Glory of God's Word, Enduring word.
 Hymns for Psalm 119, Hymnary.
 Tehillim – Psalm 119 (Judaica Press) translation with Rashi's commentary at Chabad.org
 Yemenite Jewish reading of Psalm 119, Aharon Amram (published by "מתמנה" – מזמור קי"ט בתהלים – נוסח תימן)
 .
 .

119